Blanca María Prósper Pérez is a Spanish linguist and scholar of Celtic studies. Since 2019, she has been Professor (Catedrática) in Indo-European linguistics at the University of Salamanca.

Biography
Blanca María Prósper earned a PhD in Indo-European linguistics from the Complutense University of Madrid in 1992.

Works

See also 

 Patrizia de Bernardo Stempel
 Javier de Hoz

References 

Living people
Linguists from Spain
Celtic studies scholars
Linguists of Indo-European languages
21st-century linguists
Year of birth missing (living people)